Yan Thu  (Rivals) is a 2018 Burmese drama film produced by Shwe Sin Oo Motion Picture Production. The film was based on Lun Htar Htar's novel, directed by Mee Pwar and starring Wutt Hmone Shwe Yi, Nay Chi Oo, and Nay Min as the main characters. The film was premiered in Myanmar cinemas on 14 December 2018.

The film was a nomination for the 2018 Myanmar Academy Award as Best Actress for Wutt Hmone Shwe Yi.

Cast
Nay Min - Thet Htin Nyo
Wutt Hmone Shwe Yi – San Kyal
Nay Chi Oo – Lay Pyay Nu Thway

Awards and nominations

References

External links

2018 films
2010s Burmese-language films
Films shot in Myanmar
2018 drama films
Burmese drama films